The 1936 United States Senate election in Texas was held on November 3, 1936. Incumbent Democratic U.S. Senator Morris Sheppard was re-elected to a fifth term in office, easily dispatching his challengers.

Democratic primary

Candidates
Richard C. Bush
Joe Eagle, U.S. Representative from Houston
Guy B. Fisher
J. Ed Glenn
Joseph H. Price
Morris Sheppard, incumbent Senator since 1913

Results

General election

Results

See also 
 1936 United States Senate elections

References 

Texas
1936
Senate